Cheaters is a 1934 American crime film directed by Phil Rosen and starring William Boyd, June Collyer and Dorothy Mackaill.

Main cast
 William Boyd as Steve Morris
 June Collyer as Kay Murray  
 Dorothy Mackaill as  Mabel  
 William Collier Sr. as   K.C. Kelly  
 Alan Mowbray as  Paul Southern  
 Guinn 'Big Boy' Williams as  Detective Sweeney 
 Louise Beavers as  Lily

References

Bibliography
 Pitts, Michael R. Poverty Row Studios, 1929–1940: An Illustrated History of 55 Independent Film Companies, with a Filmography for Each. McFarland & Company, 2005.

External links
 

1934 films
1934 crime films
American crime films
Films directed by Phil Rosen
American black-and-white films
1930s English-language films
1930s American films